Zheng Chaoqun (born May 31, 1989) is a Chinese baseball pitcher who plays with the Jiangsu Pegasus in the China National Baseball League. 

Zheng represented China at the 2015 Asian Baseball Championship, 2017 World Baseball Classic and 2018 Asian Games.

References

1993 births
Living people
Asian Games competitors for China
Baseball pitchers
Baseball players at the 2018 Asian Games
Chinese expatriate baseball players in the United States
Jiangsu Pegasus players
Texas AirHogs players
2017 World Baseball Classic players
2023 World Baseball Classic players